The MOFA (Ministry of Foreign Affairs) Huayu Enrichment Scholarship (HES), is a competitively awarded international scholarship for studying the Mandarin language in Taiwan. The award is not limited to countries with diplomatic ties with Taiwan.

According to the Taipei Economic and Cultural Representative Office (TECO) in San Francisco, the purpose of the HES is "The Ministry of Education (MOE) in Taiwan provides the Huayu Enrichment Scholarship for foreign Mandarin/Chinese learners including beginners to study at any accredited Mandarin center at a university or college in Taiwan."

Huayu Scholars may study at any university or college-affiliated Mandarin training center.  The scholarship may be awarded for a maximum of one year; although applications for shorter study periods of three, six and nine months are accepted.

Scholars receive a monthly maintenance stipend of NT$25,000 (~ USD as of 2017) in order to cover accommodation and living expenses. Awards are distributed through the university or college which the recipient will be attending; the document states that no additional subsidy will be given.

The program also aims to:
Help scholarship recipients acquire a better command of Mandarin Chinese, and hence a greater understanding and appreciation of Taiwan's culture;
Promote friendship between people in Taiwan and in countries around the world; and
Generate opportunities to increase exchange with international educational institutions.

See also
Scholarships in Taiwan
List of Chinese language schools in Taiwan
Taipei Economic and Cultural Representative Office
Taiwan Scholarship
Mandarin Training Center
Mandarin Learning Center

References

External links
Introduction to the Huayu Enrichment Scholarship (HES) at the TECO in Los Angeles's official site
Huayu Enrichment Scholarship at the Chinese Culture University's Mandarin Learning Center

Language education in Taiwan
Scholarships in the United States
Student exchange
Student financial aid
Scholarships in Taiwan